Peucedanum kupense is a species of flowering plant in the family Apiaceae. It is found only in Cameroon. Its natural habitat is subtropical or tropical high-altitude grassland.

References

kupense
Flora of Cameroon
Vulnerable plants
Taxonomy articles created by Polbot
Taxobox binomials not recognized by IUCN